Černí baroni is a Czechoslovak comedy film released in 1992. The movie is directed by Zdenek Sirový and stars Václav Vydra, Jan Kraus, Miroslav Donutil, Jiří Schmitzer, and Ondřej Vetchý.
It is based on the 1969 novel Černí baroni by Miloslav Švandrlík.

Synopsis
The film presents "Pétepáky"—members of the Technical auxiliary battalion—an army battalion formed by people known as class enemies of communism in Czechoslovakia in the 1950s. The group includes intellectuals, people of bourgeois origins, peasants, religious adherents, etc. This group is offset by their commanders, who are uneducated but politically active. From the clashes between the two groups, absurd situations arise, parodying the conditions of the period in Czechoslovak history.

Cast and characters

External links
 

1992 films
Czechoslovak comedy films
1992 comedy films
Films set in the 1950s
Czech comedy films